The 2019 UC Davis Aggies softball team represented the University of California, Davis in the 2019 NCAA Division I softball season. The Aggies were coached by Erin Thorpe in her fifth season, playing their home games at La Rue Field. They finished 39–14 overall, setting a program record for wins since transitioning to the Division I level in 2008, and finished third in the Big West Conference with a 13–8 record.

Sophomore pitcher Brooke Yanez was named the Big West Pitcher of the Year and a second-team All-American by Softball America after she posted a 25–7 record, a 1.03 ERA, and 273 strikeouts. She threw the first perfect game in program Division I history against Sacramento State on March 12, a no-hitter against Cal Poly on April 14, and a program record-tying 18 strikeouts against Hawaii on May 9. 

The Aggies set numerous single-season Division I program records during the season. As a team, they established new records in batting average (.278), slugging percentage (.409), on-base percentage (.353), RBI (217), total bases (562), runs (249), home runs (34), fielding percentage (.9698), ERA (1.859), winning percentage (.736) and shutouts (16). Individually, Yanez set new marks in wins, ERA and strikeouts. Senior infielder Meghan Bradbury set records in slugging percentage (.556), RBI (41), home runs (9) and total bases (84) while sophomore outfielder Alyse Rojas set a new record with 44 runs.

Previous season
The Aggies finished the 2018 season 27–24 overall, 9–12 in Big West play, finishing in a tie for fourth place. It was the first winning season, and highest win total, since the program transitioned to the Division I level in 2008.

Preseason

Big West Conference coaches poll
The Big West Conference coaches poll was released on February 1, 2019. UC Davis was picked to finish third in the Big West Conference with 34 votes and one first-place vote. It was the highest that the team had been voted in the preseason poll since they were picked to finish second in 2011.

Roster

Source:

Schedule

Awards and honors

References

UC Davis Aggies
UC Davis Aggies softball seasons
UC Davis Aggies softball